Brilliance is the fourth studio album by Atlantic Starr. This album featured hit singles "Love Me Down" and "Circles". The album also contained the Sam Dees composition "Your Love Finally Ran Out", which was previously recorded by their then labelmate Les McCann under the title "So Your Love Finally Ran Out For Me" on his 1979 album Tall, Dark & Handsome.

Track listing

 "Love Me Down" (David Lewis, Wayne Lewis) - 4:50
 "Sexy Dancer" (David Lewis, Wayne Lewis) - 4:51
 "Love Moves" (Wayne Lewis) - 5:00
 "Your Love Finally Ran Out" (Sam Dees) - 4:47
 "Circles" (David Lewis, Wayne Lewis) - 4:52
 "Let's Get Closer" (Harold Johnson) - 5:23
 "Perfect Love" (Greg Phillinganes, Allee Willis) - 4:39
 "You're the One" (David Cochrane, Deborah Thomas) - 4:12

Personnel 

Atlantic Starr 
 Sharon Bryant – lead vocals (1, 5, 8), backing vocals
 Wayne Lewis – keyboards, backing vocals, lead vocals (2, 3, 4)
 David Lewis – guitars, backing vocals, lead vocals (6, 7)
 Clifford Archer – bass guitar 
 Porter Carroll, Jr. – drums, backing vocals
 Joseph Phillips – percussion
 Koran Daniels – saxophone
 Damon Rentie – tenor saxophone
 Jonathan Lewis – trombone
 Duke Jones – trumpet, flugelhorn
 William Sudderth III – trumpet

Additional Musicians
 David Cochrane – guitars
 Greg Phillinganes – Fender Rhodes (7), Minimoog bass (7)

Arrangements 
 James Anthony Carmichael (1-8)
 David Lewis (1, 2, 5)
 Wayne Lewis (1, 2, 3, 5)
 Atlantic Starr (4, 6, 7, 8)

Production
 James Anthony Carmichael – producer 
 Calvin Harris – engineer, mixing 
 Jane Clark – additional engineer
 Dan Bates – assistant engineer
 John Convertino – assistant engineer
 Fred Law – assistant engineer
 Bernie Grundman – mastering 
 Chuck Beeson – art direction 
 Lynn Robb – design 
 Diem Jones – front cover photography 
 Michelle Armitage – front cover photo assistant
 Mike Shaw – back cover photography 
 Rod Taylor – sleeve photography 
 Earl Cole – management

Studios
 Recorded at Sigma Sound Studios (Philadelphia, PA); Motown Recording Studios (Los Angeles, CA); Kendun Recorders (Burbank, CA).
 Mixed at Motown Recording Studios
 Mastered at A&M Studios (Hollywood, CA).

Charts

Weekly charts

Year-end charts

References

Atlantic Starr albums
1982 albums
A&M Records albums
Albums produced by James Anthony Carmichael